Taourit Ighil is a town in northern Algeria.

External links

Communes of Béjaïa Province
Cities in Algeria
Algeria